Maurice Carmel Timbs  (1917 – 1994) was a senior Australian public servant and administrator.

Born in 1917, Timbs joined the Australian Public Service in 1936.

In 1943, during his war service with AIF artillery, he married Heather Joan Woodhead in the first service wedding in the Northern Territory.

After the war, he held a number of  positions including Executive Commissioner of the Atomic Energy Commission in the early 1970s. He was promoted to his first Secretary position in January 1973, as head of the new Department of Services and Property.

Between 1976 and 1984, Timbs was a Christmas Island Phosphate Commissioner.

Awards and honours
Timbs was made an Officer of the Order of Australia in June 1981.

Timbs Street in Casey, Australian Capital Territory is named for Maurice Timbs.

References

1917 births
1994 deaths
Australian public servants
Officers of the Order of Australia